Margo Malowney (born 8 August 1967) is a Canadian beach volleyball player. She competed in the women's tournament at the 1996 Summer Olympics.

Malowney stayed after her playing career active in the sport of beach volleyball as a marketeer and experience sharer. She is a marketing and communication executive and educator in MBA and CSR. Malowney is also involved in foster care for rescue dogs. She is also an author.

She is the aunt of volleyball player Amanda Malowney.

References

1967 births
Living people
Canadian women's beach volleyball players
Olympic beach volleyball players of Canada
Beach volleyball players at the 1996 Summer Olympics
Sportspeople from Saint John, New Brunswick